The 2017 AFC Futsal Club Championship was the 8th edition of the AFC Futsal Club Championship, an annual international futsal club tournament in Asia organised by the Asian Football Confederation (AFC). It was held in Ho Chi Minh City, Vietnam from 20 to 30 July 2017.

The tournament was won by Chonburi Bluewave from Thailand after defeating Giti Pasand Isfahan from Iran 3–2 in the final. The win was Chonburi Bluewave's second Asian title, following after they won the 2013 AFC Futsal Club Championship four years ago.

Nagoya Oceans from Japan were the defending champions, but they failed to qualify from the 2016–17 season of Japanese futsal league following their loss to Shriker Osaka for the Japanese champions.

Qualified teams
A total of 14 teams from the 14 of the 47 AFC member associations entered the tournament, which included first-time entrants from Tajikistan. Kyrgyzstan returned after a one-year absence, while Indonesia entered a team for the first time since 2011. From the associations participating in 2016, only Chinese Taipei did not enter the tournament.

For teams entering the tournament, they were assigned a seeding position according to their 2016 AFC Futsal Club Championship ranking for the respective draw and the hosts associations.

Venue
The all matches was held at the Phú Thọ Indoor Stadium in Ho Chi Minh City.

Draw
The draw was held on 30 May 2017, 15:00 ICT (UTC+7), at the Grand Hotel Saigon in Ho Chi Minh City. The 14 teams were drawn into two groups of four teams (Groups A and B) and two groups of three teams (Groups C and D), with the representatives from hosts Vietnam automatically assigned to position A1 in the draw. The teams were seeded according to the performances of their association's representatives in the 2016 AFC Futsal Club Championship.

Squads
Each team must register a squad of 14 players, minimum two of whom must be goalkeepers (Regulations Articles 30.1 and 30.2).

Match officials
The following referees were chosen for the 2017 AFC Futsal Club Championship.
Referees
 Darius Turner
 Hussain Ali Al-Bahhar
 Liu Jianqiao
 Lee Po-fu
 Mahmoudreza Nasirloo
 Hiroyuki Kobayashi
 Tomohiro Kozaki
 Nurdin Bukuev
 Mohamad Chami
 Helday Idang
 Rey Ritaga
 Kim Jong-hee
 Maiket Yuttakon
 Azat Hajypolatov
 Trương Quốc Dũng

Group stage
The top two teams of each group advance to the quarter-finals.

Tiebreakers
Teams are ranked according to points (3 points for a win, 1 point for a draw, 0 points for a loss), and if tied on points, the following tiebreaking criteria are applied, in the order given, to determine the rankings (Regulations Article 10.5):
Points in head-to-head matches among tied teams;
Goal difference in head-to-head matches among tied teams;
Goals scored in head-to-head matches among tied teams;
If more than two teams are tied, and after applying all head-to-head criteria above, a subset of teams are still tied, all head-to-head criteria above are reapplied exclusively to this subset of teams;
Goal difference in all group matches;
Goals scored in all group matches;
Penalty shoot-out if only two teams are tied and they met in the last round of the group;
Disciplinary points (yellow card = 1 point, red card as a result of two yellow cards = 3 points, direct red card = 3 points, yellow card followed by direct red card = 4 points);
Drawing of lots.

All times are local, Indochina Time (UTC+7).

Group A

Group B

Group C

Group D

Knockout stage
In the knockout stage, extra time and penalty shoot-out are used to decide the winner if necessary, except for the third place match where penalty shoot-out (no extra time) is used to decide the winner if necessary (Regulations Articles 14.1 and 15.1).

Bracket

Quarter-finals

Semi-finals

Third place match

Final

Tournament team rankings

Top goalscorers

Awards

 Most Valuable Player
  Ali Asghar Hassanzadeh ( Giti Pasand Isfahan)
 Top Scorer
  Jirawat Sornwichian (9 goals)
 Fair Play Award
  Thái Sơn Nam
 All-Star Team
  Katawut Hankampa (Chonburi Bluewave) (GK)
  Farhad Tavakoli (Naft Al-Wasat)
  Ali Asghar Hassanzadeh ( Giti Pasand Isfahan)
  Diego Costa (Al Rayyan)
  Suphawut Thueanklang (Chonburi Bluewave)
 Reserve All-Star Team
  Sepehr Mohammadi Giti Pasand Isfahan) (GK)
  Kritsada Wongkaeo (Chonburi Bluewave)
  Jirawat Sornwichian (Chonburi Bluewave)
  Hossein Tayyebi (Thái Sơn Nam) 
  Ahmad Esmaeilpour ( Giti Pasand Isfahan)
 Coach:  Rakphol SaiNetngam (Chonburi Bluewave)

References

External links
, the-AFC.com
AFC Futsal Club Championship 2017, stats.the-AFC.com

2017
Club Championship
2017
2017 in Vietnamese football
Sport in Ho Chi Minh City
July 2017 sports events in Asia